Mal Amiri-ye Olya (also Romanized as Māl Amīrī-ye ‘Olyā) is a village in Gamasiyab Rural District, in the Central District of Sahneh County, Kermanshah Province, Iran. At the 2006 census, its population was 246, in 56 families.

References 

Populated places in Sahneh County